Pieter van den Keere ( 1571 – c. 1646) was a Flemish engraver, publisher and globe maker who worked for the most part of his career in England and the Dutch Republic.

Life
He was born in Ghent, son of engraver Hendrik van den Keere, and around 1583-4 moved with his family for religious reasons to London. His sister, Colette van den Keere, who immigrated with van den Keere married Jodocus Hondius three years later. In London, van den Keere received training as an engraver from Jodocus Hondius, his brother-in-law. In 1593, both Keere and Hondius settled in Amsterdam. In Amsterdam he was betrothed on 7 September 1599 to Anna Burts or Beurt from Ghent, but he became betrothed again there on 10 March 1623 to a widow from Hoorn, Anna Winnens van Gent, possibly due to the death of his first wife. After 1630, there are few details of his life. The dating of some plates for John Speed's Prospect of the Most Famous Parts of the World of 1646 indicates that he was still alive then.

Works
From his time in England there is a map of Ireland from 1592, Hyberniae novissima descriptio. It was published by Hondius and served as a model for later editions of the Theatrum of Abraham Ortelius. Keere also contributed to John Norden's Speculum Britanniae of 1593.

For Willem Barents Keere engraved plates for Caertboeck Vande Middel-landsche Zee. He also worked with Petrus Bertius, Cornelis Claesz, Petrus Plancius, the House of Visscher, and Lucas Janszoon Waghenaer. In 1595, there appeared a large wall map of Europe in 10 sheets, Nova totius Europae descriptio.

From 1603, Keere began creating large urban panoramas, including Utrecht, Cologne, Amsterdam, and Paris. Around 1604, he was preparing the publication of the atlas Germania Inferior id est Provincuarum XVII. This first appeared in 1617, with a foreword by Petrus Montanus.

Miniature Speeds 
A series of 44 plates for the British Isles, from about 1599, took a long time to publish. They were based on Christopher Saxton, Ortelius, and Giovanni Battista Boazio, respectively for England and Wales, Scotland, and Ireland. They appeared in 1617 in a Latin edition of the Britannia of William Camden, by Willem Blaeu. Later, these plates came to William Humble or George Humble (according to Royal Geographical Society fellow, Carl Moreland and David Bannister—map dealer—in "Antique Maps") who issued them (with some modification and expansion) in 1627 as a miniature version of the atlas of John Speed. Thereby van den Keere's works came by the name "Miniature Speeds".

Carl Moreland and David Bannister in "Antique Maps" state that in 1627 publisher George Humble "published a major edition of Speed's Atlas," who in turn "also issued" the van den Keere maps "as a pocket edition. For these he used the descriptive texts of the larger Speed maps and thereafter they were known as Miniature Speeds". Moreland and Bannister also write that "of the 63 maps in the Atlas, 40 were from the original van den Keere plates."

References

External links

Biblioteca Nacional de España:
Complete atlas 1622 Scroll to "Ver Obra"

California State Library, Sutro Branch, San Francisco, CA. USA:
Nova Totius Orbis Mappa, Ex Optimus Auctoribus Desumta (World Map), c. 1611

Koninklijke Bibliotheek van België:
Belgii Veteris
Brabantia Ducatus
Germaniae Inferioris
Flandriae
Leo Belgicus (ingekleurd)
Leo Belgicus
Leo Belgicus
Leodiensis Episcopatus (Luik)
Lutzenburgensis Ducatus (Luxemburg)
XVII Provinces of Low Germanie

Universiteitsbilbliotheek van Amsterdam
Alcmaer
Angliæ Regnum
Daniae Regni Typus
Flandria (met tekst)
Moravia Marchionatus
Namurcum (Namen)
Silesiae Ducatus
Typus Frisiae Orientalis
Wachtendonk
Webpage describing 9 maps

Jouwprenten.nl
Hollandia
Novus XVII Inferioris
Zeeland
Maps by van den Keere , Eran Laor Cartographic Collection, Scanned maps, the National Library of Israel

1571 births
1646 deaths
Flemish engravers
Flemish printmakers
Flemish publishers
Businesspeople from Ghent
Dutch engravers
Flemish scientists
Scientists from Ghent
17th-century Dutch cartographers
Dutch typographers and type designers
Belgian typographers and type designers